Australobuthus is a monotypic genus of scorpions in the Buthidae family. Its sole species is Australobuthus xerolimniorum, also known as the salt lake scorpion. It is endemic to Australia and was first described by Nicholas Locket in 1990.

Etymology
The generic name Australobuthus means ‘southern buthid’, with reference to the family. The epithet xerolimniorum ‘dry water body’ refers to the species’ habitat.

Description
The scorpions are small, growing to a maximum length of about 45 mm. They are very pale in colour, largely lacking pigmentation.

Distribution and habitat
The species is known only from the vicinity of salt lakes in inland South Australia.

Behaviour
The scorpions are nocturnal surface foragers on the crusts and along the shorelines of salt lakes, preying on small invertebrates.

References

Australobuthus
Scorpions of Australia
Endemic fauna of Australia
Fauna of South Australia
Monotypic arachnid genera
Animals described in 1990
Scorpion genera